Nokia Theater or  Nokia Theatre may refer to:

 Nokia Theatre L.A. Live, a former name of Microsoft Theater in Los Angeles, California, United States
 Nokia Theater (New York), a former name of the PlayStation Theater in Times Square, New York City, United States
 Nokia Theatre at Grand Prairie, a former name of the Verizon Theatre at Grand Prairie in Grand Prairie, Texas, United States

See also 
 Nokia Arena,  Tel Aviv
 Nokia (disambiguation)